Deer Creek is a stream in Henry County in the U.S. state of Missouri. It is a tributary of the South Grand River.

Deer Creek was named for the fact deer were hunted there.

See also
List of rivers of Missouri

References

Rivers of Henry County, Missouri
Rivers of Missouri